This list of bridges in Kosovo lists bridges of particular historical, scenic, architectural or engineering interest. Road and railway bridges, viaducts, aqueducts and footbridges are included.

Historical and architectural interest bridges

Major road and railway bridges 
This table presents the structures with spans greater than 100 meters (non-exhaustive list).

See also 

 Transport in Kosovo
 Roads in Kosovo
 Kosovo Railways
 Geography of Kosovo

References

Further reading 
 

Kosovo
 
Bridges